The Wood Fountain is an outdoor public architectural sitework on Indiana University-Purdue University's campus.  The campus is located in Indianapolis, Indiana.  The Wood Fountain is commissioned by IUPUI (Indianapolis University - Purdue University) and completed in 1995.  Singh Associates in New York City designed the sculpture, while Tom Fansler III manages the fountain. The purpose of this artwork, according to the Smock Fansler website, was to provide "better places to live," and bring "spaces between buildings and the elements that tie them together..."

Description
The sitework used stone to mimic a pyramid in the shape of a diamond.  They added water so this artwork can be used as a fountain.  It sits on IUPUI's campus along New York St with the pathways surrounding made out of brick.  According to IUPUI's website, the artwork "is 100 feet long on each of its four sides." There are four levels to the piece with nine slight indentations along each siding.  In addition, there are triangles that have been sculpted in to the stone so that water will come down to the base.  On the proper front, there is a bronze memorial plaque at the bottom.  It reads:

THE WOOD PLAZA
DEDICATED JUNE 26, 1995
THIS PLAZA WAS NAMED IN
GRATEFUL RECOGNITION OF THE SUPPORT OF
BILLIE LOU & RICHARD D. WOOD

Material
The Wood Fountain is made from stone and has water that runs down its sides.  In addition, the artwork's surrounding landscape is a part of the artwork.  Therefore, the trees, bushes, flowerbeds, benches (which are made out of limestone and granite), and the walkway are made out of brick.

Location history

The Wood Fountain is located at The Wood Plaza, which is a place on IUPUI's campus where social events such as the Indy Jazzfest and Explore IUPUI are held. The sculpture is located behind the University Library along New York St. The Wood Plaza was named after an Eli Lilly chief executor, Robert D. Wood and his wife Billie Lou Wood.  According to IUPUI's Jaguar Spirit online source, "the Wood Plaza was designed on the same axis of University Library and intended to complement the library architecturally."  In a newsletter from IUPUI's Chancellor in December 1996, an award was given from the "local chapter of the American Institute of Architects...with an Achievement award for their design, construction and enhancement of the physical and visual environments of Marion County."  The importance of this recognition gives insight into how valuable the Wood Plaza is, not only to the IUPUI Campus, but to the community.

Documentation
A Museum Studies course at IUPUI recently undertook the project of researching and reporting on the condition of 40 outdoor sculptures on the university campus. The Wood Fountain was included in this movement. This documentation was influenced by the successful Save Outdoor Sculpture! 1989 campaign organized by Heritage Preservation: The National Institute of Conservation partnered with the Smithsonian Institution, specifically the Smithsonian American Art Museum. Throughout the 1990s, over 7,000 volunteers nationwide have cataloged and assessed the condition of over 30,000 publicly accessible statues, monuments, and sculptures installed as outdoor public art across the United States.

Student Legend
While touring the campus, one may hear of a secret society for those who have climbed to the top of the fountain. Some students believe that at the top of the fountain lives a hidden inscription with instructions to find the society. Others believe, in order to join the society, you must post a picture of yourself at the top of the fountain on social media. In this case, the society will then reach out to you.

Because of this student legend, in an attempt to curb fountain climbers, climbing to the top of the fountain often leads to suspension or expulsion from the campus.

References

1995 sculptures
Fountains in Indiana
Indiana University – Purdue University Indianapolis Public Art Collection
Outdoor sculptures in Indianapolis
Limestone sculptures in Indiana
Granite sculptures in Indiana
1995 establishments in Indiana